Nīca is a village in Nīca Parish, South Kurzeme Municipality in the Courland region of Latvia. Nīca had 981 residents as of 2006.

Towns and villages in Latvia
South Kurzeme Municipality
Grobin County
Courland